From Russia with Love may refer to:
 From Russia, with Love (novel), a 1957 novel by Ian Fleming
 From Russia with Love (film), a 1963 film based on the novel
 From Russia with Love (soundtrack) or its title song
 From Russia with Love (video game), a video game based on the novel and film
 From Russia with Love (Tori Amos album) (2010)
 From Russia with Love (Cold War album) (2004)
 Anastasia Dobromyslova or From Russia with Love (born 1984), Russian darts player

See also

 To Russia with Love (film), a 2014 documentary film 
 To Russia with Love (album), a 1994 album by Mannheim Steamroller
From the Fatherland, with Love, a 2005 alternate history novel by Ryū Murakami
McVan's To Russia With Love Scottish Terrier show dog, Best in Show at Crufts in 2015
"To Russia with Love" 2014 single by Courtney Act